This is page shows results of Canadian federal elections in the Fraser Valley region of British Columbia.  As defined for this article, the Fraser Valley includes the southern suburbs of Vancouver.  Areas outside the Fraser Valley, namely the Fraser Canyon and regions to its west, are also included within one of the ridings. The largest of these ridings is the Chilliwack-Hope riding. This riding also includes most of the Fraser Valley until it joins the Okanagan-Similkameen and extends westward until outside Abbotsford.

Regional profile
The Fraser Valley is traditionally one of the most socially conservative areas in British Columbia, although it is slowly becoming more liberal as urban sprawl extends eastward. This region has been dominated by the Conservatives and the former Reform and Canadian Alliance parties for most of the time from 1993 to 2011.

The northern parts of Surrey historically leaned toward the NDP until the 1990s. In 2011, the Liberals lost their remaining seat in the region, while the NDP picked up two seats in Surrey. The NDP won Surrey North in 2006 which was the first time the NDP won a seat in the region since 1988. They lost the riding to the Conservatives in 2008 before winning it back in 2011, only to lose it to the Liberals in 2015.

The base of Liberal support in the region has traditionally been in Richmond. They held the seat of Richmond from 1993 to 2000 and from 2004 to 2008. Since then, the Conservatives have made inroads with the Chinese community in Richmond, and have held Richmond ever since. By then, the two seats representing Richmond had been captured by the Conservatives. The Liberals picked up a second seat in the region in 2006, Newton—North Delta which they lost to the NDP in 2011.  However, in 2015, the Liberals regained the seat's successor, Surrey-Newton. They also managed to regain parts of the city of Richmond, specifically Steveston-Richmond East. The Conservatives gained both seats back in 2019, only to lose both to the Liberals in 2021.

Conservative support has traditionally been the strongest in the Fraser Valley Regional District, Langley and in southern Surrey. Since 2004, the Conservatives' best riding has been Abbotsford. In 2011, they won 65% of the vote there. They also won over 60% of the vote in neighboring Langley. The FVRD is sometimes referred to BC's "bible belt" due to its high population of evangelical Christians, giving it a character similar to ridings in rural portions of the Prairies.

2019 - 43rd General Election

2015 - 42nd General Election

2011 - 41st General Election

2008 - 40th General Election

2006 - 39th General Election

2004 - 38th General Election

2000 - 37th General Election

References

Fraser Valley
Political history of British Columbia